The 1962 All-Ireland Senior Hurling Championship was the 76th staging of the All-Ireland hurling championship since its establishment by the Gaelic Athletic Association in 1887. The championship began on 15 April 1962 and ended on 2 September 1962.

Tipperary were the defending champions, and retained the championship after defeating Wexford by 3-10 to 2-11 in the All-Ireland final.

Teams

A total of twelve teams contested the championship.

Team summaries

Results

Leinster Senior Hurling Championship

First round

Quarter-final

Semi-finals

Final

Munster Senior Hurling Championship

Quarter-finals

Semi-finals

Final

All-Ireland Senior Hurling Championship

Final

Championship statistics

Top scorers

Top scorers overall

Top scorers in a single game

Scoring

Widest winning margin: 20 points 
Tipperary 5-14 - 2-3 Waterford (Munster final, 5 August 1962)
Most goals in a match: 8 
Laois 4-5 - 4-3 Westmeath (Leinster quarter-final, 19 April 1962)
Wexford 5-14 - 3-6 Laois (Leinster semi-final, 8 July 1962)
Most points in a match: 26 
Kilkenny 4-16 - 1-10 Dublin (Leinster semi-final, 1 July 1962)
Cork 1-16 - 4-10 Waterford (Munster semi-final, 8 July 1962)
Most goals by one team in a match: 5 
Laois 5-8 - 2-1 Offaly (Leinster first round, 15 April 1962)
Wexford 5-14 - 3-6 Laois (Leinster semi-final, 8 July 1962)
Tipperary 5-13 - 2-4 Limerick (Munster semi-final replay, 22 August 1962)
Tipperary 5-14 - 2-3 Waterford (Munster final, 5 August 1962)
Most goals scored by a losing team: 4 
Westmeath 4-3 - 4-5 Laois (Leinster quarter-final, 29 April 1962)

Miscellaneous

 The All-Ireland final between Tipperary and Wexford becomes the first championship game to be broadcast live on Telefís Éireann.

Broadcasting

The following matches were broadcast live on television in Ireland on Telefís Éireann. Commentary was provided by Seán Óg Ó Ceallacháin in English and Micheál Ó Muircheartaigh in Irish.

Sources

 Corry, Eoghan, The GAA Book of Lists (Hodder Headline Ireland, 2005).
 Donegan, Des, The Complete Handbook of Gaelic Games (DBA Publications Limited, 2005).
 Sweeney, Éamonn, Munster Hurling Legends (The O'Brien Press, 2002).

References

1962
All-Ireland Senior Hurling Championship